is a passenger railway station located in the city of Higashikagawa, Kagawa Prefecture, Japan. It is operated by JR Shikoku and has the station number "T13".

Lines
Nibu Station is served by the JR Shikoku Kōtoku Line and is located 34.4 km from the beginning of the line at Takamatsu. Only local services stop at the station.

Layout
The station consists of an island platform serving two tracks. The station building is unstaffed and serves only as a waiting room. The island platform is accessed by means of a footbridge.

History
At that time, the station was operated by Japanese Government Railways (JGR), later becoming Japanese National Railways (JNR). With the privatization of JNR on 1 April 1987, control of the station passed to JR Shikoku.

Surrounding area
Japan National Route 11

See also
List of railway stations in Japan

References

External links

Station timetable

Railway stations in Kagawa Prefecture
Railway stations in Japan opened in 1928
Higashikagawa, Kagawa